Bong Chang-won (born 19 February 1938) is a South Korean wrestler. He competed in the men's freestyle lightweight at the 1960 Summer Olympics.

In 1959, Bong was in military service with the Republic of Korea Marine Corps. He participated in the South Korean qualifying tournament for the 1959 World Wrestling Championships, but lost by decision to Cheon Dong-mun of the Republic of Korea Army. By 1961, he was attending Kyung Hee University. He came in first place in the lightweight category in the South Korean qualifying tournament for the 1961 World Wrestling Championships, defeating his classmate Hwang Yong-deuk and Gukhak University student Kim Ik-jong.

Notes

References

External links
 

1938 births
Living people
South Korean male sport wrestlers
Olympic wrestlers of South Korea
Wrestlers at the 1960 Summer Olympics
Sport wrestlers from Seoul
Asian Games medalists in wrestling
Wrestlers at the 1958 Asian Games
Wrestlers at the 1962 Asian Games
Asian Games bronze medalists for South Korea
Medalists at the 1958 Asian Games
Kyung Hee University alumni
20th-century South Korean people
21st-century South Korean people